Geraldo Francisco dos Santos (11 June 1962 – 29 July 2021), nicknamed Zizinho, was a Brazilian professional footballer who played as a midfielder.

Career
Born in São Paulo, Brazil, dos Santos began his professional career in Mexico in 1980 with América. He also played for León and Necaxa, making a total of 135 appearances, scoring 27 goals, in the Primera División de México.

Dos Santos played in MISL for Los Angeles Lazers for the 1986 and 1987 seasons.

He later played for Monterrey La Raza, an indoor team that played in the Continental Indoor Soccer League, between 1993 and 1997.

Personal life
Dos Santos had three sons, who were also all footballers - Éder (born 1984), Giovani (born 1989) and Jonathan (born 1990).

He died from COVID-19 on 29 July 2021, at the age of 59.

References

1962 births
2021 deaths
Footballers from São Paulo
Brazilian footballers
Association football midfielders
Club América footballers
Club León footballers
Continental Indoor Soccer League players
Los Angeles Lazers players
Major Indoor Soccer League (1978–1992) players
Monterrey La Raza players
Brazilian expatriate footballers
Brazilian expatriate sportspeople in Mexico
Expatriate footballers in Mexico
Deaths from the COVID-19 pandemic in California